The Federal government of Nigeria is composed of three distinct branches namely the legislative, executive, and judicial, whose powers are vested and bestowed upon them by the Constitution of the Federal Republic of Nigeria, the National Assembly, the President, and lastly the federal courts, which includes the Supreme Court which is regarded as the highest court in Nigeria respectively. One of the major functions of the constitution is that it provides for separation and balance of powers among the three branches and aims to prevent the repetition of past mistakes made by the government, some other functions of the constitution includes that it divides power between the federal government and the states and it also protects various individual liberties of the citizens of the nation.

Nigeria is a federal republic in the sense that there is both a national government and governments of its 36 states and it utilizes the form of government in which the people hold power, but elect representatives to exercise and utilize that power with the executive power exercised by the president. The president is the head of state, the head of government, and also the head of a multi-party system. Nigerian politics takes place within a framework of a federal, presidential, representative democratic republic, in which executive power is exercised by the government. Legislative power is held by the federal government and the two chambers of the legislature: the House of Representatives and the Senate, the legislative branch of Nigeria is responsible for and possesses powers for the formulation and making of laws Together, the two chambers make up the law-making body in Nigeria, called the national assembly, which serves as a check on the executive arm of government, The National Assembly of Nigeria (NASS) is the democratically elected body that represents the interests of the Federal Republic of Nigeria and its people, makes laws for Nigeria and holds the Government of Nigeria to account. The National Assembly (NASS) is the nation's highest legislature, whose power to make laws is summarized in chapter one, section four of the 1999 Nigerian Constitution. Sections 47-49 of the 1999 Constitution state inter alia that "There shall be a National Assembly (NASS) for the federation which shall consist of two chambers: the Senate and the House of Representatives". The Economist Intelligence Unit rated Nigeria a "hybrid regime" in 2019. The federal government, state, and local governments of Nigeria aim to work cooperatively to govern the nation and its people. Nigeria became a member of the British Commonwealth upon its independence from British colonial rule on 1 October 1960.

Legal system

The law of Nigeria is based on the rule of law, the independence of the judiciary, and British common law (due to the long history of British colonial influence). The common law in the legal system is similar to common-law systems used in England and Wales and other Commonwealth countries. The constitutional framework for the legal system is provided by the Constitution of Nigeria.

English law, which is derived from its colonial past with Britain; Nigeria belongs to the common law family, this is because English law makes up a substantial part of the Nigerian law. Nigeria though now a sovereign nation was once under British rule. When she gained her independence in 1960 numerous English laws were copied. Most of the laws which they copied have now been repealed in England. Nigeria also received all laws that were in force in England on 1 January 1900.
Common law, case law development since colonial independence; Common law can be defined as that unwritten body of laws which is based on judicial precedents. For unusual  and irregular occurring cases where the result can in no way be resolved by the basis of current laws or written law regulations, common law guides the decision-making process.
Customary law, which is derived from indigenous traditional norms and practices; In Nigeria, customary law can be divided in terms of nature into two different classes which are, the ethnic or non-Muslim customary law and the Muslim law (Sharia). The Ethnic customary law in Nigeria is indigenous and this  system of such customary law applies and is valid to members of a specific ethnic group. Muslim law is a religious law that solely based on the Muslim faith and is applicable to the members of such faith. In the nation Nigeria, it is not an indigenous law; it is received customary law introduced into the county as part of Islam.

Sharia law, law used in some states in the northern region. in two principal respects the sharia law greatly differs from Western systems of law. first things first in terms of scope the sharia law possesses a much wider, wider scope since it regulates the individual’s relationship not only with his or her neighbors and the state, which is perceived as the limit of most other legal systems, but also with God and with the individual’s own conscience. Ritual practices—such as the daily prayers (ṣalāt), almsgiving (zakāt), fasting (ṣawm), and pilgrimage (hajj)—are an integral part of sharia law and usually occupy the first chapters in legal manuals. The sharia is concerned as much with ethical standards as with legal rules, indicating not only what an individual is entitled or bound to do in law but also what one ought, in conscience, to do or to refrain from doing.

There is a judicial branch, with the Supreme Court regarded as the highest court of the Nation.

Legislation as a source of Nigerian law
The two fundamental sources of Nigerian law through legislation are

(1) Acts of British parliament, popularly referred to as statutes of general application during the period before independence.

(2)  Local legislation (comprising enactments of the Nigerian legislatures from colonial period to date). There were other sources which though subsumed in Nigerian legislations were distinctly imported into the Nigerian legal systems. They are called the criminal and penal codes of Nigeria.

Nigerian statutes as sources of Nigerian law
Nigerian legislation may be classified as follows. The colonial era until 1960 , post independence legislation 1960-1966 , the military era 1966-1999.

Post-independence legislation 1960-1966
The grant of independence to Nigeria was a milestone in the political history of the country. This period witnessed the consolidation of political gains made during the colonial era. Politicians genuinely focused their lapses in the polity. It achieved for herself a republican status by shaking off the last vestiges of colonial authority. However, despite the violent violation of its provisions, the constitution remained the subsequent administrations (military or otherwise).

Military regime, 1966-1999
The Armed forces of Nigeria assumed the rulership of Nigeria in 1966 – 79 and 1983 – 99 except in August – September, 1992. The breakdown of law and order which occurred in the period under review would not be attributed to any defect in the Nigerian legal system.  Corrupt practices both in the body politics and all aspects of Nigerian life eroded efficiency and progress. There were 8 coups generally,  five were successful and 3 were unsuccessful.

Executive branch

The president is elected through universal suffrage which is regarded as more than a privilege extended by the state to its citizenry, and it is rather thought of as an inalienable right that inheres to every adult citizen by virtue of citizenship. In democracies it is the primary means of ensuring that governments are responsible to the governed. The president is both the chief of state and head of government, heading the Federal Executive Council, or cabinet, The constitution makes the president the chief executive and commander in chief of the armed forces in Section 130. The constitution of 1999 vests all the executive powers of the federation in the person of the president which can be exercised directly by him or his vice president or members of his cabinet. Section 5(1)(b) provides that the executive powers of the president extends to the maintenance of the provisions of the constitution, acts of the national assembly and on items on which the national assembly has power for the time being to make law. The president is elected to see that the Nigerian Constitution is enacted and that the legislation is applied to the people. The elected president is also in charge of the nation's armed forces and can serve no more than two four-year elected terms. The current President of Nigeria is Muhammadu Buhari, who was elected in 2015 and the current Vice President is Yemi Oshinbajo.

The executive branch is divided into Federal Ministries, each headed by a minister appointed by the president, Federal Ministries are those civil service departments which were made responsible for delivering various types of government service and each ministry is headed by a Permanent Secretary who reports to a Minister in the Federal Cabinet, Nigeria has 24 Federal Ministries as of recent The president must include at least one member from each of the 36 states in his cabinet. The President's appointments are confirmed by the Senate of Nigeria. In some cases, a federal minister is responsible for more than one ministry (for example, Environment and Housing may be combined), or a minister may be assisted by one or more ministers of State. Each ministry also has a Permanent Secretary, who is a senior civil servant.

The ministries are responsible for various parastatals (government-owned corporations), such as universities, the National Broadcasting Commission, and the Nigerian National Petroleum Corporation. However, some parastatals are the responsibility of the Office of the Presidency, such as the Independent National Electoral Commission, the Economic and Financial Crimes Commission and the Federal Civil Service Commission.

Legislative branch
The Legislature is said to be the first among the three Arms of Government – the Legislature, Executive, and the Judiciary. These Arms are characterized by the principle of separation of power as each is supposed to be independent of the other. The Legislature derives its powers from the 1999 Constitution (as amended) in Sections 4(1) and 4(2). The Legislature is vested with the powers to make laws for the peace, order and good governance of the Federation.

“It is also vested with investigatory powers, financial powers, confirmation and impeachment powers. It would not be out of place for me to use this occasion to remind us that the Legislature is the symbol of democracy all over the world. Under Section 4 (1) of the 1999 Constitution of the Federal Republic of Nigeria (as amended) (the "Constitution"), the National Assembly of Nigeria often called NASS is vested with the legislative powers of the Federal Republic of Nigeria. That is the power to make laws for the peace, order, and good government of the Federation with respect to any matter included in the Exclusive Legislative List and the Concurrent List - a list of 12 items that both NASS and States' house of Assembly can legislate on. This legislative power is typically exercised through Bills passed by the NASS which are assented to by the President. Bills generally come in two forms - either a Private Bill which affects private citizens, corporate entities and/or a particular class of people or Public Bills which affect the general public. A Bill can be introduced into either chamber of the NASS by members of the respective chambers or the Executive arm of government. The National Assembly of Nigeria has two chambers: the House of Representatives and the Senate. The House of Representatives is the lower chamber of Nigeria's bicameral National Assembly and is presided over by the Speaker of the House of Representatives. It has 360 members each of the  Federal Constituencies of the country, who are elected for four-year terms in single-seat constituencies. The Senate, which has 109 members, is presided over by the President of the Senate. 108 members are elected for four-year terms in 36 three-seat constituencies, which correspond to the country's 36 states. One member is selected in the single-seat constituency of the federal capital.

The legislators are elected to either the House of Representatives or the Senate to be representatives of their constituencies and to pass legislation to benefit the public. The legislative process consists of bills being drafted and presented in either of the two chambers. These bills can only become national law once they are approved by the president of Nigeria who can veto bills.

The President of the Senate is currently Ahmed Ibrahim Lawan, who was elected to the senate in 2007, and the Speaker of the House is Femi Gbajabiamila, who has been Nigeria's 9th Speaker of the House of Representatives since 2019. Each member of the National Assembly of Nigeria can be elected to more than two four-year terms. Recently, the Legislative branch has been misusing its position as a check on the power of the president and his cabinet. Legislators have been known to utilize their power for not only law-making, but as a means of political intimidation and a tool to promote individual monetary success.

Senators are paid a salary equivalent to over $2,200 USD a month, supplemented by expenses of $37,500 USD a month (2018 figures).

Judicial branch
The National Judicial Council serves as an independent executive body, separating the judiciary arm of government from the executive arm of government.The judicial branch is made up of the Supreme Court of Nigeria, the Court of Appeals, the High Courts, and other trial courts such as the Magistrates', Customary, Sharia and other specialized courts. The National Judicial Council serves as an independent executive body, insulating the judiciary from the executive arm of government. According to the 1999 constitution, the Supreme Court has both original and appellate jurisdictions (the power to reverse, modify and change a decision or ruling made by a lower court), Appellate jurisdiction exists for both the civil law and criminal law, the supreme court has the sole authority and jurisdiction to entertain appeals from Court of Appeal, having appellate jurisdiction over all lower federal courts and highest state courts. Decisions and rulings by the court are binding and absolute on all courts in Nigeria except the Supreme Court itself.The Supreme Court is presided over by the Chief Justice of Nigeria and thirteen associate justices, who are appointed by the President of Nigeria on the recommendation of the National Judicial Council. These justices are subject to confirmation by the Senate.

The judicial branch of the Nigerian government is the only one of the three branches of government in which its members are not elected but are appointed. The judiciary, and the Supreme Court in particular, are intended to uphold the principles and laws of the nation's constitution that was written in 1999. Its goal is to protect the basic rights of the citizens. The current Chief Justice of the Supreme Court is Olukayode Ariwoola .

Democracy in Nigeria 
After achieving her independence and Republican status in the year 1960, (that year Nigerians became the citizens of the 4th biggest democratic country in the world) and 1963 respectively, Nigeria experienced its first military coup in the year 1966 and thereafter civil war broke in 1967 and lasted till 1970. It was made possible to bring back the democratic ideal for a few of years in the year 1978. Though this certain period of democratic ideal did not last very long and was soon over in 1983 as a result of some military rulers who came into power via coup d’etat promised to return the country to democracy.

Nevertheless, only General Abdulsalami Abubakar took the control of the nation after the death of Sani Abacha and stuck to his word. The country’s modern Constitution became official in 1999. The elections in the year 1999 were more successful compared to that of the previous military ruler. The newly emerged President of Nigeria Olusegun Obasanjo put a stop to the military regimes that kept switching one after the other for almost 30 years. The end of the military rule culminated in a new era of regular elections as well as the return of civil liberties, a free press, and an end to arbitrary arrests and maltreatment, although human rights violations still occur regularly. Nigeria democratized in 1999 with the start of the Fourth Republic, but has suffered some setbacks to becoming fully democratic. Elites in Nigeria have been found to have more power and influence than average citizens, and as a consequence of this, there has been a great deal of corruption in Nigerian politics and general life. A good sign of democracy in Nigeria is the fact that elections are becoming less fraudulent and there is more party competition. Another indicator of a strong democracy is the presence of a civil society in which citizens have the right to act and speak freely in concert with a strong use of media for everyday life. Furthermore, Nigeria has seen a heightened use of media within the realm of political issues, particularly with the recent [Special Anti-Robbery Squad] SARS protest, indicating a sense of freedom for the public to voice their opinions to the government and the world.

Level of freedom 
According to the 2020 World Press Freedom Index, Nigeria is the 115th most free nation in the world. It has been noted as a nation with perpetuating violence against freedom of speech and press. Nigeria has been found to be a vulnerable nation, both at risk of modern slavery and corruption. The nation is vulnerable due to the effects of inner conflict and governance issues.  Freedom House has rated Nigeria as a "partly free" nation. In the last presidential election, the process was tainted by violence, intimidation and vote buying, which have been prevalent in many of the recent elections within Nigeria. Similarly, in the most recent legislative elections, citizens claimed the process was also characterized by intimidation and other inconsistencies. The electoral process and related laws are thought to be enacted in a mostly fair fashion, but there have been instances of intentionally complicating voting and effecting turnout. The people of Nigeria feel as though there is more freedom in their right to have different political parties to represent their opinions. This is exemplified by the vast number of legitimate parties seen in elections. Similarly, Nigerian opposition parties have a legitimate chance to participate in politics and win official positions. In regards to freedom of political expression, Freedom House indicates that opinions and institutions are often heavily influenced by non-governmental, external entities or individuals. In Nigeria, all ethnic groups and religious backgrounds have an equal opportunity to participate in politics, however, there is a lack of women elected into the government, and same-sex relationships were criminalized in 2014. The Nigerian Federal Government's officials like the president and legislators are elected to enact policy and laws, and are usually allowed to do so without interruption, but in recent years, their ability to legislate has been marred by corruption and instability. Corruption has been a major problem for the Nigerian government since its independence from colonial rule. In particular, the oil sector has allowed a great deal of corruption to take place. The government has tried to enact measures to combat corruption that infringes upon the functioning of the state, but have only been quasi-successful. The government has also been rated as lacking in transparency, often not allowing records to be available to the public that should be readily available. Journalism and the media in Nigeria are somewhat free, they are allowed to function independently from the government, but oftentimes those who criticize public figures or offices are arrested or censored. A mafia-like organisation, Black Axe, is involved in international corruption using especially on-line fraud, as reported in BBC article.  Religious freedom is allowed in Nigeria, however, the government and even non-governmental organizations have been known to violently respond to groups that openly dissent to the federal government. Religion is a contentious topic in Nigeria because of heated, ongoing conflicts between Christians and Muslims within the state. Freedom House rated the Nigerian federal government well in the category of allowing academic freedom, and the public's ability to express their views even if they disagree without the government without fearing a negative reaction from the government. The Nigerian government was rated moderately on people's ability to assemble, ability to work with human rights, and the existence of unions. The judiciary was rated as moderately free from the government, and lacking in due process in trials and equal treatment of all members of society. People in Nigeria do not have great freedom of movement, and are often subjected to curfews set by the federal government in areas that are at a risk of violence or instability. There is a lack of protection for women in regards to rights to abortion, rape, and domestic abuse under the Nigerian federal government. Lastly, there is a pervasive human-trafficking problem in Nigeria and frequent exploitation of citizens that the federal government has done a poor job to prevent.

Political parties 
There are 18 recognized political parties in Nigeria. There are a great number of parties as a direct result of corruption and chaos that has ensued in Nigeria surrounding the federal government and elections for years. The vast number of parties has proved to be difficult to monitor. The two major parties are the Peoples Democratic Party and the All Progressives Congress, both of which have held the presidency and seats in the National Assembly for extended periods of time. As opposed to parties in other nations that represent a slew of political opinions that the public can align themselves with, parties in Nigeria act more so as a means through which prominent figures can gain power and influence, and there are so many because they often switch parties in order to find the one to give them the best chance of achieving authority.

Political parties have been an important aspect of Nigerian government both before and after independence was achieved from the British in 1960. Parties allow for political competition to take place, for the citizenry to find people who represent their ideas and interests in government, and for the introduction of new leaders and perspectives into Nigerian life. Many Nigerians do not understand the political party system because there are so many options and their platforms are unclear to the public. This remains an issue in Nigeria because it marginalizes those who are uneducated or uninvolved in government. Also, there seems to be a tendency for people in Nigeria to support parties based on ethnic of religious divisions, particularly along the Muslim-Christian line of division.

The 18 political parties are: Accord, Action Alliance, Action Democratic Party, Action Peoples Party, African Action Congress, African Democratic Congress, All Progressives Congress, All Progressives Grand Alliance, Allied Peoples Movement, Boot Party, Labour Party, National Rescue Movement, New Nigeria Peoples Party, Peoples Democratic Party, Peoples Redemption Party, Social Democratic Party, Young Progressive Party, Zenith Labour Party.

Electoral system and recent elections 
The president and members of the National Assembly of Nigeria are elected by members of the population who are at least 18 years old. The National Electoral Commission is responsible for monitoring elections and ensuring that the results are correct and not fraudulent. The winner of a position is elected through the first-past-the-post system that is used in Great Britain.

Nigeria has faced numerous bouts with fraudulent elections, particularly noteworthy is the general election that took place in 2007. This election was reportedly marred by ballot-rigging, underage voting, violence, intimidation, and an overall absence of clarity and accuracy from the National Electoral Commission.

Presidential elections of Nigeria, 2015

House of Representatives

Senate

Presidential election of Nigeria, 2019

Christian-Muslim relations 

Islamic Law has found its way into the heart of many Nigerian state governments, particularly in the northern sect of the country. There is a deep rift between Christians and Muslim in Nigeria, and therefore the government has taken on a hybrid of English Common Law and Islamic Law when dealing with legal issues in order to appease the diverse national population. Nigeria has the largest population of Christians and Muslims cohabitating in the world. These two religions were introduced in Nigeria largely during the colonial period, and since then, many Africans have merged their own traditional religions with these two institutionalized ones.

Religious tensions between Christians and Muslims in Nigeria has often been used by politicians and other powerful people in order to incite violence and create fear and chaos among Nigerians. This has led to many citizens questioning why Nigeria remains one federal state, and that it should possibly split along the Christian-Muslim divide. The Northern section of the country is largely Islamic, with 12 states that live under Sharia Law, while the Southern area is mostly Christian. There have been multiple attempts by Nigerian Muslims to add Sharia concepts to the Constitution which has alarmed the Christian population within the nation. Many Christians have deemed the rise in Islam in Nigeria to be dangerous and that it could possibly lead to increased terrorism and instability. This conflict is threatening the stability of Nigeria's democracy, internal structure, and civil society, and many political scientists and Nigerian leaders hope the two religions can engage in a peaceful dialogue that hopefully pacifies both sides.

Terrorism in Nigeria 
The greatest terrorist threat in Nigeria is from the organization Boko Haram, and became a prevalent issue in the summer of 2009. Boko Haram is a radical jihadist Islamist terrorist group from the northern sect of Nigeria. This organization has launched terror attacks that have largely targeted the Nigerian federal government, non-Muslim religious organizations, and average citizens. The rise and growing effects of Boko Haram have been attributed to the instability and fragility of the Nigerian state. They are upset by the government corruption and policy failures of Nigeria, and in particular, the poverty and lack of development of the north of Nigeria which is predominantly Muslim. The impact of Boko Haram on Nigeria has been devastating, over 37,000 individuals have died due to their terrorist attacks since 2011, and over 200,000 Nigerians have been displaced. Boko Haram was responsible for the kidnapping of hundreds of school girls in 2014, triggering the #BringBackOurGirls movement across the globe. The terrorist organization became a part of ISIS in 2015, drawing concerns to the safety and stability of Nigeria. Many world powers including the United States have contributed military resources to help fight against Boko Haram because Nigeria's oil industry is crucial to the international economy. The Nigerian federal government has launched programs and tactics to combat Boko Horam because of their prevalence. There has also been a recent rise in citizen-created, and in particular youth-led groups that are taking action against Boko Haram to protect themselves and their communities. Both the actions of Boko Haram and the government's efforts to combat terrorism have led to a growing refugee crisis in Nigeria.

Commonwealth membership 
Nigeria's membership in the British Commonwealth began in 1960 and was suspended from 1995 to 1999 when the country became a state under military rule. It was reinstated in 1999 when democracy was established with the Presidential Constitution and Fourth Republic of Nigeria, and it remains a part of the Commonwealth to this day. The Commonwealth Secretariat aims to help Nigeria detect and deter corruption within its federal government. In 2018, they taught numerous government officials and financial officers how to combat and condemn corruption within the nation. The Secretariat's involvement both in governmental and financial affairs created a better system for the transaction of goods and services in Nigeria with less risk of corruption. As of 2017, the Commonwealth has provided Nigeria with policies and resources for Great Britain's exit from the European Union and outlined the possible effects on Commonwealth nations and trade. The Commonwealth Secretariat has helped Nigeria in its natural resource fields such as oil and mining. They have helped with negotiations and the creation of fair bargains. The Commonwealth Secretariat has also provided Nigeria with access to their Connectivity Agenda, which allows nations under the Commonwealth to communicate and exchange ideas and policies to help each other with economic and domestic productivity.

States of Nigeria 

Nigeria is made up of 36 states and 1 territory. They are: the Federal Capital Territory, Abia, Adamawa, Akwa Ibom, Anambra, Bauchi, Bayelsa, Benue, Borno, Cross River, Delta, Ebonyi, Edo,  Ekiti, Enugu, Gombe, Imo, Jigawa, Kaduna, Kano, Katsina, Kebbi, Kogi, Kwara, Lagos, Nasarawa, Niger, Ogun, Ondo, Osun, Oyo, Plateau, Rivers, Sokoto, Taraba, Yobe, and Zamfara.

Local Governments
Each state is further divided into Local Government Areas (LGAs). These states and their local governments are essential to the function of a federal government because they have a pulse on the local population and can therefore assess the needs of constituents and enact policy or infrastructure that is helpful. They are also important because the federal government has the time and resources to take on national projects and international affairs while local governments can take care of the Nigerians native to their respective states. The devolution of power between the states and the federal government helps the functionality of Nigeria. 774 local governments oversee the collection of local taxes, education, health care, roads, waste, and planning. The local Government look after the  affairs of the common men and women in the Nigeria society. The creation of Local Government reform started in 1968, 1970 during the military Government but was fully 1976.

Federal Government's handling of COVID-19 
As Africa's most populated nation, the coronavirus pandemic has ravaged across Nigeria. Nigeria has proved that can detect, respond to, and prevent the COVID-19 outbreak in a very restricted, poor fashion. Nigeria lacks the resources to conduct the widespread testing the nation needs to keep up with the number of cases surging across the state. Nigeria also lacks the necessary number of other resources for fighting the virus such as hospital workers, rooms, and ventilators.

The federal government's response to the virus has been fairly weak and ineffective. President Buhari has passed numerous lockdowns, mask mandates, and travel bans to decrease the number of cases in the country. However, the lockdowns, mandates, and travel restrictions have led to negative economic effects for a great number of citizens who have lost their jobs and source of income. In response to this, the federal government has passed economic stimulus packages to promote important production sectors such as agriculture and oil. The government has also passed food assistance measures and cash transfers to aid those in poverty who are going hungry. They have also pushed for fundraising efforts to secure funds from donors to support the federal budget and economic sector.

Military

The military of Nigeria has played a major role in the country's history, often seizing control of the country and ruling it for long periods of time. Its last period of rule ended in 1999, following the death of the leader of the previous military junta Sani Abacha in 1998.

Active duty personnel in the three Nigerian armed services totals approximately 76,000. The Nigerian Army, which is the largest of the services, has about 60,000 personnel, deployed between two mechanized infantry divisions, one composite division (airborne and amphibious), the Lagos Garrison Command (a division-size unit), and the Abuja-based Brigade of Guards. The Nigerian Navy (7,000) is equipped with frigates, fast attack craft, corvettes, and coastal patrol boats. The Nigerian Air Force (9,000) flies transports, trainers, helicopters, and fighter aircraft; however, most of their vehicles are currently not operational. Recently, Marshal of the Nigerian Air Force, Sadique Abubakar, suggested the purchase of equipment after dumping the non-operational vehicles.

Foreign relations
 

Nigeria currently has better foreign relations with its neighbors, due to its current state of democracy. It is a member of the African Union and sits on that organization's Peace and Security Council.

The current Minister of Foreign Affairs of Nigeria is Geoffrey Jideofor Kwusike Onyeama. Much of Nigeria's foreign affairs, both during the colonial era and post-independence has relied on oil-production. Nigeria's relationships with both its continental neighbors in Africa and throughout the world have improved a great deal since it has transitioned from military rule to a democratic state. Nigeria is hoping to gain a permanent seat on the UN Security Council in the near future. Despite these achievements, Nigeria continues to face challenges in its foreign relations, such as the fight against terrorism and insurgency in the region, the challenge of migration and human trafficking, and the need to increase economic cooperation and integration with its neighbors.

Media 

Nigeria's media scene is characterized by state and private broadcasters, popular international brands like the BBC and CC and more than a 100 national and local print titles state and private broadcasters. Radio and televised media in Nigeria is mostly state-owned by the National Broadcasting Commission. This is often used as a tactic of the government to assert control over and sway public opinion in favor of the incumbent party and his policies. However, most newspaper are privately owned and the internet is not restricted to the public. Given that a majority (70%) of citizens are under 30, it is fitting that mobile news consumption (84%) is more than twice as high as computer consumption (41%), with tablet consumption trailing at 11%.

See also

Senate of Nigeria
National Assembly of Nigeria
List of Nigerian state governors
Nigerian Civil Service
States of Nigeria
Nigerian Prisons Services
Chief Justice of Nigeria

Further reading

 Carl Levan and Patrick Ukata (eds.). 2018. The Oxford Handbook of Nigerian Politics. Oxford University Press.

References

External links 

Government of Nigeria
 
Judiciary of Nigeria